Stouchsburg Historic District is a national historic district located in Stouchsburg, Marion Township, Berks County, Pennsylvania.  The district encompasses 91 contributing buildings in the borough of Stouchsburg. It includes residential, commercial, and institutional buildings in typical of Pennsylvania German architecture.  Notable buildings include the separately listed Peter Spycker House (c. 1750), the Marion House inn (c. 1830), the American House hotel (1871), Samuel Keiser General Store and Post Office (c. 1866), Reeds' Church (1895), and the Marion Township Fire Hall (1916).

It was listed on the National Register of Historic Places in 1985.

Gallery

References

Historic districts on the National Register of Historic Places in Pennsylvania
Historic districts in Berks County, Pennsylvania
National Register of Historic Places in Berks County, Pennsylvania